Chu Jong-Chol is a male former international table tennis player from North Korea.

He won a bronze medal at the 1987 World Table Tennis Championships in the Swaythling Cup (men's team event) with Hong Chol, Kim Song-hui and Li Gun-Sang for North Korea.

Two years later he won another bronze at the 1989 World Table Tennis Championships with Kim Song-hui, Li Gun-Sang and Yun Mun-Song.

See also
 List of table tennis players
 List of World Table Tennis Championships medalists

References

North Korean male table tennis players
World Table Tennis Championships medalists
20th-century North Korean people